The 2017 World Wheelchair Curling Championship was held from March 4 to 11 at the Gangneung Curling Centre in Gangneung, South Korea. Norway won a third title after winning over Russia, who defeated Norway during the 2016 championship final.

Qualification
 (host country) 
Top seven teams from the 2016 World Wheelchair Curling Championship:

 
Two teams from the 2016 World Wheelchair Curling B-Championship

Qualification event
Finland and Scotland qualified for the World Championship from the qualifying event held during November 2016 in Lohja, Finland.

Teams
The teams are listed as follows:

Round-robin standings
Final round-robin standings

Round-robin results
All draw times are listed in Korean Standard Time (UTC+09).

Draw 1
Saturday, March 04, 9:00

Draw 2
Saturday, March 04, 15:30

Draw 3
Sunday, March 05, 10:00

Draw 4
Sunday, March 05, 15:00

Draw 5
Monday, March 06, 10:00

Draw 6
Monday, March 06, 15:00

Draw 7
Tuesday, March 07, 10:00

Draw 8
Tuesday, March 07, 15:00

Draw 9
Wednesday, March 08, 10:00

Draw 10
Wednesday, March 08, 15:00

Draw 11
Thursday, March 09, 10:00

Draw 12
Thursday, March 09, 15:00

Tiebreaker
Friday, March 10, 10:00

 advances to the playoffs

Relegation Game
Friday, March 10, 10:00

 lost the relegation game, but because the host Scotland and additional eight teams who placed second to ninth from this competition were invited to the 2019 World Wheelchair Curling Championship, Germany still qualified for the 2019 championship as the ninth-place team.

Playoffs

1 vs. 2
Friday, March 10, 15:00

3 vs. 4
Friday, March 10, 15:00

Semifinal
Saturday, March 11, 10:00

Bronze medal game
Saturday, March 11, 15:00

Gold medal game
Saturday, March 11, 15:00

References

External links

2017 World Wheelchair Curling Championship - Curlingzone

World Wheelchair Curling Championship
World Wheelchair Curling Championship
World Wheelchair Curling Championship
International curling competitions hosted by South Korea
Wheelchair